An audiophile is a person who is enthusiastic about high-fidelity sound reproduction. An audiophile seeks to reproduce the sound of a piece of recorded music or a live musical performance, typically inside closed headphones, In-ear monitors, open headphones in a quiet listening space, or a room with good acoustics.

Audiophile values may be applied at all stages of music reproduction: the initial audio recording, the production process, and the playback, which is usually in a home setting. In general, the values of an audiophile are seen to be antithetical to the growing popularity of more convenient but lower quality music, especially lossy digital file types like MP3, lower definition streaming services, and inexpensive headphones.

The term high-end audio refers to playback equipment used by audiophiles, which may be bought at specialist shops and websites. High-end components include turntables, digital-to-analog converters, equalization devices, preamplifiers and amplifiers (both solid-state and vacuum tube), loudspeakers (including horn, electrostatic and magnetostatic speakers), power conditioners, subwoofers, headphones, and acoustic room treatment in addition to room correction devices.

Although many audiophile techniques are based on objective criteria that can be verified using techniques like ABX testing, perceived sound quality is necessarily subjective, leading to some more controversial audiophile techniques being based on pseudoscientific, magical or paranormal principles.

Audio playback components
An audio system typically consists of one or more source components, one or more amplification components, and (for stereo) two or more loudspeakers.

Signal cables (analog audio, speaker, digital audio etc.) are used to link these components. There are also a variety of accessories, including equipment racks, power conditioners, devices to reduce or control vibration, record cleaners, anti-static devices, phonograph needle cleaners, reverberation reducing devices such as speaker pads and stands, sound absorbent foam, and soundproofing.

The interaction between the loudspeakers and the room (room acoustics) plays an important part in sound quality. Sound vibrations are reflected from walls, floor and ceiling, and are affected by the contents of the room. Room dimensions can create standing waves at particular (usually low) frequencies.  There are devices and materials for room treatment that affect sound quality. Soft materials, such as draperies and carpets, can absorb higher frequencies, whereas hard walls and floors can cause excess reverberation.

Sound sources 
Audiophiles play music from a variety of sources including phonograph records, compact discs (CDs), and digital audio files that are either uncompressed or are losslessly compressed, such as FLAC, DSD, Windows Media Audio 9 Lossless and Apple Lossless (ALAC), in contrast to lossy compression, such as in MP3 encoding. From the early 1990s, CDs were the most common source of high-quality music. Nevertheless, turntables, tonearms, and magnetic cartridges are still used, despite the difficulties of keeping records free from dust and the delicate set-up associated with turntables.

The 44.1 kHz sampling rate of the CD format, in theory, restricts CD information losses to above the theoretical upper-frequency limit of human hearing – 20 kHz, see Nyquist limit.  Nonetheless, newer formats such as FLAC, ALAC, DVD-Audio and Super Audio Compact Disc (SACD) have sampling rates of 88.2 kHz, 96 kHz or even 192 kHz.

CD audio signals are encoded in 16-bit values. Some higher-definition consumer formats such as HDCD-encoded CDs, DVD-Audio, and SA-CD contain 20-bit, 24-bit and even 32-bit audio streams. With more bits more dynamic range is possible; 20 bit dynamic range is theoretically 120 dB—the limit of most consumer electronic playback equipment.

SACDs and DVD-Audio have up to 5.1 to 6.1 surround sound.  Although both high-res optical formats have failed, there has been a resurgence in high-res digital files.  SACD can be stored as a DSD file, and DVD-Audio can be stored as a FLAC or ALAC file.  FLAC is the most widely used digital format for high-res with up to 8 channels and a maximum depth of 32 bit, and 655,350 Hz sampling rate.  Uncompressed formats such as WAV and AIFF files can store audio CDs with no compression.

Amplifiers 
A preamplifier selects among several audio inputs, amplifies source-level signals (such as those from a turntable), and allows the listener to adjust the sound with volume and tone controls. Many audiophile-oriented preamplifiers lack tone controls. A power amplifier takes the "line-level" audio signal from the preamplifier and drives the loudspeakers. An integrated amplifier combines the functions of power amplification with input switching and volume and tone control.  Both pre/power combinations and integrated amplifiers are widely used by audiophiles.

Audiophile amplifiers are available based on solid-state (semiconductor) technology, vacuum-tube (valve) technology, or hybrid technology—semiconductors and vacuum tubes.

Dedicated amplifiers are also commonly used by audiophiles to drive headphones, especially those with high impedance and/or low sensitivity, or electrostatic headphones.

Loudspeakers 
The cabinet of the loudspeaker is known as the enclosure.  There are a variety of loudspeaker enclosure designs, including sealed cabinets (acoustic suspension), ported cabinets (bass-reflex), transmission line, infinite baffle, and horn loaded. The enclosure plays a major role in the sound of the loudspeaker.

Depending on the frequencies reproduced, the drivers that produce the sound are referred to as tweeters for high frequencies, midranges for middle frequencies e.g.voice and lead instruments, and woofers for bass frequencies. Driver designs include dynamic, electrostatic, plasma, ribbon, planar, ionic, and servo-actuated. Drivers are made from a variety of materials including paper pulp, polypropylene, kevlar, aluminum, magnesium, beryllium, and vapor-deposited diamond.

The direction and intensity of the output of a loudspeaker, called dispersion or polar response, has a large effect on its sound. Various methods are employed to control the dispersion.  These methods include monopolar, bipolar, dipolar, 360-degree, horn, waveguide, and line source. These terms refer to the configuration and arrangement of the various drivers in the enclosure.

The positioning of loudspeakers in the room has a strong influence on the sound experience. Loudspeaker output is influenced by interaction with room boundaries, particularly bass response, and high frequency transducers are directional, or "beaming".

Accessories 
Audiophiles use a wide variety of accessories and fine-tuning techniques, sometimes referred to as "tweaks", to improve the sound of their systems. These include power conditioner filters to "clean" the electricity, equipment racks to isolate components from floor vibrations, specialty power and audio cables, loudspeaker stands (and footers to isolate speakers from stands), and room treatments.

There are several types of room treatment. Sound-absorbing materials may be placed strategically within a listening room to reduce the amplitude of early reflections, and to deal with resonance modes.  Other treatments are designed to produce diffusion, reflection of sound in a scattered fashion. Room treatments can be expensive and difficult to optimize.

Headphones 

Headphones are regularly used by audiophiles.  These products can be remarkably expensive, some over $10,000, but in general are much cheaper than comparable speaker systems. They have the advantage of not requiring room treatment, and being usable without requiring others to listen at the same time. However, many audiophiles still prefer speaker systems over headphones due to their ability to simulate an immersive, rounded sonic environment. Newer canalphones can be driven by the less powerful outputs found on portable music players.

Design variety 

For music storage, digital formats offer an absence of clicks, pops, wow, flutter, acoustic feedback, and rumble, compared to vinyl records.  Depending on the format, digital can also have a higher signal-to-noise ratio, a wider dynamic range, less total harmonic distortion, and a flatter and more extended frequency response. Despite this, vinyl records remain popular, and discussion about the relative merits of analog and digital sound continues (see Comparison of analog and digital recording).  (Note that vinyl records may be mastered differently from their digital versions.)

In the amplification stage, vacuum-tube electronics remain popular, despite most other applications having since abandoned tubes for solid state amplifiers.  Also vacuum-tube amplifiers often have higher total harmonic distortion, require rebiasing, are less reliable, generate more heat, are less powerful, and cost more. There is also continuing debate about the proper use of negative feedback in amplifier design.

Community 
The audiophile community is scattered across many different platforms and communication methods. In person, one can find audiophiles at audio-related events such as music festivals, theaters, and concerts. The online audiophile community is even more widespread, with users on web forums and apps such as Facebook, Reddit, and others. These groups are people who are self-identified audiophiles that will often contribute to their communities by mentoring new audiophiles, posting their current audio configurations, and sharing news related to the audiophile community.

Among the listeners themselves, audiophiles will commonly differentiate community members between "golden eared" and "wooden eared" individuals. Those who are deemed as having "golden ears" are people who can accurately express the description of a sound or sonic environment, whereas those with the "wooden ears" are implied to be untrained in listening and needing more guidance or assistance. These labels are not permanent, however, and people within these two groups can move between the groups interchangeably, often depending on the judgement of others within the community.

Controversies 

There is substantial controversy on the subject of audiophile components; many have asserted that the occasionally high cost produces no measurable improvement in audio reproduction. For example, skeptic James Randi, through his foundation One Million Dollar Paranormal Challenge, offered a prize of $1 million to anyone able to demonstrate that $7,250 audio cables "are any better than ordinary audio cables". In 2008, audio reviewer Michael Fremer attempted to claim the prize, and said that Randi declined the challenge. Randi said that the cable manufacturer Pear Cables was the one who withdrew.

Another commonly referenced study done by Philip Greenspun and Leigh Klotz of the Massachusetts Institute of Technology found that although test subjects were able to distinguish between high fidelity, "expensive" cables versus common use cables, there was no statistically significant preference between the two cables. Greenspun and Klotz expect that critics of the study will point to the fact that this experiment was not done as a double-blind test, but this critique has a counter in that the study participants felt as though the experiment solely isolated the subjects' opinions on sound quality and nothing more.

There is disagreement on how equipment testing should be conducted and as to its utility.  Audiophile publications frequently describe differences in quality which are not detected by standard audio system measurements and double blind testing, claiming that they perceive differences in audio quality which cannot be measured by current instrumentation, and cannot be detected by listeners if listening conditions are controlled, but without providing an explanation for those claims.

Criticisms usually focus on claims around so-called "tweaks" and accessories beyond the core source, amplification, and speaker products. Examples of these accessories include speaker cables, component interconnects, stones, cones, CD markers, and power cables or conditioners. One of the most notorious "tweakers" was Peter Belt, who introduced numerous eccentric innovations that included a £500 "quantum clip" that consisted of a crocodile clip with a short length of copper wire attached.

See also 
 Broadcast quality
 Professional audio
 Videophile

 Audiophile publications
 The Absolute Sound
 Stereophile
 What Hi-Fi? Sound and Vision

References

External links
Audiophilia: The Online Journal for the Serious Audiophile
Why We Need Audiophiles (Gizmodo)
High end Audio and Audiophile Pages
Enjoy the Music.com: Equipment reviews, industry news, shows reports, etc.
Portuguese High end Audio benchmark reviews and reports website from José Victor Henriques.

Audio societies
Audiophile Society of New South Wales
Bay Area Audiophile Society
Boston Audio Society
Chicago Audio Society
Colorado Audio Society
Los Angeles and Orange County Audio Society
Pacific Northwest Audio Society

Hobbies
Audio engineering